Lopen is a village and civil parish in the South Somerset district of Somerset, England, situated  west of Yeovil. The village has a population of 260 people.

History
The name of the village means Lufa's pen or fold.

A Roman mosaic, probably from a Roman villa, was found in the village in 2001. The Lopen Roman Mosaic was discovered by George Caton who was operating a mechanical digger and noticed small cubes of coloured stone, which turned out to be part of the floor of an eight-roomed Roman Villa and is the largest Roman Mosaic so far discovered in Britain. Photogrammetry by English Heritage  was followed by excavation  led by the Somerset County Council archaeologist exposed and documented the mosaic in three weeks. It was then covered with sand and soil to preserve it. The work was recognised with the award of the Tarmac Finders Award (for non professionals) at the British Archaeological Awards in 2002. The stones used for the mosaic are Blue Lias from the surrounding hills. The fragments which were discovered in the surrounding soil were used to create a new mosaic, featuring a cantharus, using methods which would have been available in Roman times. It is now displayed in All Saints Church.

Lopen is listed in the Domesday Book, with three manors, one of which was held by the Knights Templar. These were bought by the Poulett's of Hinton St George in 1560s. The parish of Lopen was part of the South Petherton Hundred.

In the 18th century the parish was noted for flax growing and for the production of linen sailcloth and twine. These industries continuing until the end of World War II. A mill had first been recorded in the parish around 1285. The mill was a water/grist mill until the mid 18th, then becoming jointly used as a grain mill and for linen production.

Governance
The parish council has responsibility for local issues, including setting an annual precept (local rate) to cover the council's operating costs and producing annual accounts for public scrutiny. The parish council evaluates local planning applications and works with the local police, district council officers, and neighbourhood watch groups on matters of crime, security, and traffic. The parish council's role also includes initiating projects for the maintenance and repair of parish facilities, as well as consulting with the district council on the maintenance, repair, and improvement of highways, drainage, footpaths, public transport, and street cleaning. Conservation matters (including trees and listed buildings) and environmental issues are also the responsibility of the council.

The village falls within the Non-metropolitan district of South Somerset, which was formed on 1 April 1974 under the Local Government Act 1972, having previously been part of Chard Rural District. The district council is responsible for local planning and building control, local roads, council housing, environmental health, markets and fairs, refuse collection and recycling, cemeteries and crematoria, leisure services, parks, and tourism.

Somerset County Council is responsible for running the largest and most expensive local services such as education, social services, libraries, main roads, public transport, policing and  fire services, trading standards, waste disposal and strategic planning.

Lopen is part of the Yeovil county constituency represented in the House of Commons of the Parliament of the United Kingdom. However, in the Boundary Commission proposal of 2011 it would become part of a new constituency provisionally called Glastonbury and Wincanton.  It elects one Member of Parliament (MP) by the first past the post system of election.

Geography
The parish of Lopen is bounded to the north by the A303 Trunk Road and to the south by Lopen Brook with the road from South Petherton to Merriott, Crewkerne and the south coast running through the middle. Between Lopenhead and Lopen the road crosses the ancient Roman Fosse Way, which at this point is just a minor country lane.

The main retail outlets in the parish are the pub and an organic food shop at Lopen Head, but although they are in the parish they are not really in the village itself which is located half a mile to the south. The road from Lopenhead to Lopen descends steeply through a deep and twisty cutting with no pedestrian pavement. However these outlets can be safely reached on foot by way of a footpath from the church.

Religious sites

The Anglican parish Church of All Saints  has 12th- or 13th-century origins, but was largely rebuilt in the 14th and 15th centuries with the north transept being added in 1833. As Lopen chapel it was granted to Bruton Priory in 1209 becoming dependent on South Petherton church, later passing to Bristol Cathedral and obtaining burial rights in 1574.

Culture
Punkie Night is celebrated in the village of Hinton St George each October.

References

External links

Lopen village website

Villages in South Somerset
Civil parishes in Somerset